Ostbevern is a municipality in the district of Warendorf, in North Rhine-Westphalia, Germany.

Geography
Ostbevern is situated on the river Bever, approx. 18 km north-east of Münster and 18 km north-west of Warendorf.

Neighbouring municipalities
Ostbevern borders Ladbergen, Lienen, Glandorf (in Lower Saxony), Warendorf, Telgte and Greven.

Division of the town
The municipality Ostbevern consists of the village Ostbevern, the district Brock and the surrounding farming land.

History
In 1088 Bevern was first mentioned in an official document under the name Beverne. Presumably in the 12th century the parish Bevern was split into Ostbevern and Westbevern (which is now part of Telgte).

During the Napoleonic Wars the municipality first fell to Prussia, then to Berg. Since 1810 it then belonged to the French Empire, until Ostbevern was assigned to prussia again at the Congress of Vienna. Since World War II Ostbevern lies in North Rhine-Westphalia.

Politics

Communal Politics

After the local elections of 2014, the 26 seats of the municipal council are distributed like this:
 CDU: 13 seats
 FDP: 4 seats
 SPD: 5 seats
 Green Party: 4 seats

Twin Towns
Ostbeverns twins the city Loburg in Saxony-Anhalt.

Economy
The economy in Ostbevern is characterized by agriculture and processing business. The FRIWO Group has its headquarters in Ostbevern.

Tourist attractions
The Ambrose-church consist of a big new part, built in 1962 a smaller  gothic church built in the 16th century. Parts of the church steeple are from the 12th century.

Another beautiful sight is the moated castle Loburg, in which there is today an episcopal school.

People 
 Joseph Annegarn (1794-1843), catholic theologian and writer
 Herman Koeckemann (1828-1892), catholic vicar apostolic of the Vicariate Apostolic of the Sandwich Islands
 Wolfgang Riesinger (born 1951), long-distance runner

References

External links
 Website of the municipality Ostbevern 
  Local heritage book Ostbevern 
 Friwo company website